The 2008 Huddersfield Giants season saw the club compete in Super League XIII as well as the 2008 Challenge Cup tournament.

Results

2008 squad

2008 Signings

Transfers In

Transfers out

Fixtures and results
Engage Super League XIII Huddersfield Giants

Round 1.

Round 2.

Round 3.

Round 4.

Round 5.

Round 6.

Round 7.

Round 8.

Carnegie Challenge Cup

Round 9.

Round 10.

Round 11.

Round 12.

Round 13.

 Round 14.

References

Huddersfield Giants seasons
Huddersfield Giants season